Abdelnasser Rashid is a Democratic member of the Illinois House of Representatives for the 21st district. The district includes the Southwest Side and southwest suburbs.

Rashid is the first Palestinian-American to serve in the Illinois General Assembly and is its first Muslim member, along with Nabeela Syed.

Early life and education 
Rashid was born in Chicago, Illinois. He holds a Bachelor of Arts from Harvard University and a Master of Business Administration in Finance and Economics from the University of Chicago Booth School of Business.

Career 
Rashid worked on Chuy García's 2015 mayoral campaign and on Bernie Sanders's 2016 presidential campaign. He also served as deputy chief of staff to Cook County Clerk David Orr, for two years.

In 2018, Nasser unsuccessfully ran for Cook County Commission. In 2020, he ran for Cook County Board of Review, also unsuccessfully.

Rashid had been advised to change his name to "Nas" and downplay his background in order to appeal to voters with prejudices against Arabs or perceived foreigners.

Electoral history

References 

21st-century American politicians
Living people
Democratic Party members of the Illinois House of Representatives
Members of the Illinois House of Representatives
American people of Palestinian descent
Harvard College alumni
University of Chicago Booth School of Business alumni
Year of birth missing (living people)